Rosenhain is surname of:

 Johann Georg Rosenhain (1816 - 1887), German mathematician
 Jakob (Jacob, Jacques) Rosenhain (1813, Mannheim – 1894, Baden-Baden), a Jewish German pianist and composer
 Walter Rosenhain (1875, Berlin – 1934), an Australian metallurgist

See also 
 

German-language surnames
Jewish surnames
Yiddish-language surnames